Gözne is a small town in Mersin Province, Turkey.

Geography 

It is situated in the southern slopes of the Taurus Mountains. In some locations of the town, both Mersin and the Mediterranean Sea can be viewed. The road between Mersin and Gözne is quite well cared and accessible whole year, the average travel time being about 30 minutes.

The winter (settled) population of the town was 3746 (2012 est.)

History 

It is known that there was a prehistoric settlement in the area which now is Gözne. So far, only one inscription has been unearthed which is in Aramaic. Gözne Castle was built in the Middle Ages.

The modern settlement in Gözne dates back to 19th century when people from Mersin and Tarsus  began to use the surrounding as a summer resort.

During the Turkish War of Independence, Mersin and Tarsus were under French occupation  and Gözne was one of the centers of the nationalists. After the liberation of Mersin in 1922, Gözne became a village and then a town in 1956.

Gözne as summer resort 

Both being Mediterranean cities, Mersin and Tarsus are hot during the summers months. So it was a practice among the people to migrate to Gözne in summer months.  During the 19th century and early 20th century, usually the landlords stayed in Mersin and met with their families on the weekends. However, after the roads were constructed it is just a short drive from Mersin, and it is possible to spend the night in Gözne and work in Mersin. Nevertheless, after the beginning of beach tourism and other touristic activities as well as the advance in climatization technology,  Gözne is not as popular as it used to be.

References and notes 

Towns in Turkey
Yaylas in Turkey
Tourist attractions in Mersin Province
Populated places in Toroslar District
Populated places in Mersin Province